Albert "Al" Raines (?? – ??) was an American long-distance runner who is recognized as having set a world's best in the marathon on May 8, 1909, with a time of 2:46:04 3-5 at the Bronx Marathon. Described as a former member of the Xavier Athletic Association, he won the race by over a mile.
Raines competed in at least five marathons and a 20 miler in a three-month period from February 8, 1909, to May 31, 1909. On February 8, 1909, he won an "amateur marathon" in Brooklyn, New York, and on My 8th he won the Bronx Amateur Marathon.

On July 14, 1909, he resigned from the Amateur Athletic Union.

Notes

References

Year of birth missing
Year of death missing
World record setters in athletics (track and field)
American male marathon runners